The Open Network (previously Telegram Open Network, both abb. As TON) is a blockchain-based decentralized computer network technology, originally developed by the Telegram team. In May 2020, Telegram withdrew from the project after litigation with the US Securities and Exchange Commission.

History 
Since the release of Telegram messenger in 2013, its CEO Pavel Durov emphasized that instant messenger will not include advertising. According to documents related to U.S. Securities and Exchange Commission (SEC) v. Telegram suit (2020), by 2017, the self-funded startup needed money to pay for servers and services. Durov considered venture capital financing but decided against it until the problems are solved. In the mid-December 2017 Bloomberg interview, Durov announced that Telegram would begin monetization in early 2018. TechCrunch had soon confirmed that the company planned launch a blockchain project named “The Open Network” or “Telegram Open Network” (TON) and its native cryptocurrency “Gram”.

In January 2018, a 23-page white paper and a detailed 132-page technical paper shed some light on the project. According to documents, the Durovs planned to attract the existing Telegram user base to TON and promote the mass adoption of cryptocurrencies, turning it into one of the largest blockchains. TON was described as a platform for decentralized apps and services akin to WeChat, Google Play, or App Store, or even a decentralized alternative to payment processing services of Visa and MasterCard due to its ability to scale and support millions of transactions per second. The codebase for TON was created by Nikolai Durov, the developer of Telegram's MTProto protocol, and Pavel became the public figure for the project.

Gram Private Sale 
To fund the development of the messenger and the blockchain project, Telegram attracted investments through a private Gram offering. A two-step legal scheme was employed: the Gram purchase agreement was structured as a future contract that allowed investors to receive tokens once TON is launched. As futures were only sold to accredited investors, the offering was exempt from registration as securities under Regulation D of the Securities Act of 1933, on the basis that once TON was operational, the Grams would have utility and would not be considered securities. The contract was drafted by major U.S. law firm Skadden.

The offering ran in two rounds, each taking in $850 million. Russian tech news site calculated the first round as offering 2.25 billion tokens at $0.38 each, with a minimum purchase of $20 million, and the second as offering 640 million tokens at $1.33 each, with a minimum purchase of $1 million. As of April 2018, the firm had reported raising $1.7 billion through the ongoing ICO. Company officials have not made any public statements regarding the ICO. As of spring 2018, the only official sources of information were the two Forms D that Telegram filed with the U.S. Securities and Exchange Commission.

Development 
The development of TON took place in a completely isolated manner and was opaque for the whole time. The launch of the test network was initially scheduled for Q2 2018 with the main network launch in Q4, but the milestones were postponed several times. The testnet was launched in January 2019 with a half a year deviation from the plan. In May the company released the lite version of the TON blockchain network client. In September the company released the complete source code for TON nodes on GitHub, making it possible to launch a full node and explore the testnet. The launch of the TON main network was scheduled for October 31.

SEC v. Telegram 
SEC had concerns about Gram private sale and contacted Telegram shortly after, but over the 18 months of communication, the sides didn't come to an understanding. On October 11, 2019, a couple of weeks before the planned TON launch, SEC obtained a temporary restrictive order to prevent the distribution of Grams. The regulator contended that initial Gram purchasers would be acting akin to underwriters, and the resale of Grams, once distributed, will be an unregistered distribution of securities.

After a lengthy legal battle between Telegram and the SEC, Judge P. Kevin Castel of the U.S. District Court for the Southern District of New York agreed with the SEC's vision that the sale of Grams, the distribution to initial purchasers, and the highly likely future resale should be viewed as a single "scheme" to distribute Grams to the secondary market in an unregistered security offering. The "security" at issue consisted of the whole set of contracts, expectations, and understandings around the sale and the distribution of tokens to the interested public, and not the Grams themselves. In this case, the initial purchasers acted as underwriters that planned to resell tokens, and not to consume them. The restrictions on Gram distribution remained in force for purchasers based in and outside U.S., as Telegram had no tools to prevent U.S. citizens from purchasing Grams on the secondary market.

Following the court decision, the Telegram Open Network team announced that they would be unable to launch the project by the expected 30 April 2020 deadline. On 12 May 2020, Pavel Durov announced the end of Telegram's active involvement with TON. On June 11, Telegram settled with SEC U.S. Securities & Exchange Commission and agreed to return $1.22 billion as "termination amounts" in Gram purchase agreements, and pay an $18.5 million penalty to SEC. The company also agreed to notify the SEC of any plans to issue digital assets over the next three years. The judge approved the settlement on June 26. "New and innovative businesses are welcome to participate in our capital markets, but they cannot do so in violation of the registration requirements of the federal securities laws," the SEC spokesperson noted. Telegram had subsequently shut down TON test network 

In 2020, Telegram repaid TON investors $770 million and converted $443 million into a one-year debt at 10% interest, raising its total liabilities to $625.7 million. On 10 March 2021, the company made the placement of 5-year bonds worth $1 billion to cover the debts it had to return by 30 April 2021.

Post Telegram 

By May 2020, when Telegram's commitment to the project was unclear, other projects started to develop the technology.

Launched on May 7, 2020, Free TON is a project to continue development of Telegram Open Network technology using the source code freely available under GNU GPL. By January 2021, the community of the project reached 30,000 people. Free TON's token titled "TON Crystal" or just "TON" is distributed as a reward for contributions to the network.  Of five billion tokens issued at the moment of launch, 85% were reserved for users, 5% for validators, and 10% for the developers (including 5% dedicated for TON Labs, the developer of TON OS middleware for TON blockchain, which is the essential part of Free TON).

References

Blockchains
Cryptocurrencies
Free software programmed in C++